Iulian Sebastian Filipescu (born 29 March 1974) is a Romanian former professional footballer who played as a centre back. He debuted in Divizia A with Steaua București in 1993 and became part of a league championship winning team for seven seasons in a row from 1993 to 1999: five titles with Steaua and two with Galatasaray in Turkey. He then joined Real Betis of Spain, and played four and a half seasons there before joining FC Zürich in the Swiss Super League.

Filipescu made his debut for the Romania national team in 1996 against Yugoslavia, and represented his country at the UEFA Euro 1996, 1998 FIFA World Cup and UEFA Euro 2000. He played his last international match in 2003, earning 52 caps and scoring one goal.

Career
Filipescu was born in Slatina.

During the 2006 Swiss Championship FC Basel 1893 were atop the league table, leading Zürich by three points heading into the last game of the season. Both teams met at that last game at St. Jakob Park, where Zürich needed to win to tie with Basel on points and take the title on superior goal differential. Alhassane Keita scored in the 31st minute and gave Zurich the advantage, Mladen Petrić tying it at 1–1 in the 73rd minute. In the 93rd, Filipescu scored the game-winning goal past Pascal Zuberbühler, with Zürich winning both the game 2–1 and the Swiss Super League title. After the final whistle, Basel fans stormed the pitch and chased the Zürich players and officials. Filipescu was the main target for scoring the winning goal and was almost hit by a large firework.

Career statistics

Honours
Steaua București
 Liga I: 1992–93, 1993–94, 1994–95, 1995–96, 1996–97
 Cupa României: 1995–96
 Supercupa României: 1994, 1995

Galatasaray
 Süper Lig: 1997–98, 1998–99
 Turkish Cup: 1998–99

FC Zürich
 Swiss Super League: 2005–06
 Swiss Cup: 2005

References

External links
 
 
 

1974 births
Living people
Sportspeople from Slatina, Romania
Romanian footballers
Association football defenders
Romania international footballers
1998 FIFA World Cup players
UEFA Euro 1996 players
UEFA Euro 2000 players
Liga I players
La Liga players
Süper Lig players
Swiss Super League players
Bundesliga players
2. Bundesliga players
Faur București players
CSA Steaua București footballers
Galatasaray S.K. footballers
Real Betis players
FC Zürich players
MSV Duisburg players
Romanian expatriate footballers
Romanian expatriate sportspeople in Turkey
Expatriate footballers in Turkey
Romanian expatriate sportspeople in Spain
Expatriate footballers in Spain
Romanian expatriate sportspeople in Switzerland
Expatriate footballers in Switzerland
Romanian expatriate sportspeople in Germany
Expatriate footballers in Germany